Mr. Imperium (UK title: You Belong to My Heart) is a 1951 romantic musical drama Technicolor film produced by Metro-Goldwyn-Mayer and starring Lana Turner and singer Ezio Pinza. It was directed by Don Hartman, who cowrote the screenplay with Edwin H. Knopf based on a play written by Knopf. The musical score was composed by Bronisław Kaper. Turner's singing voice was dubbed by Trudy Erwin.

In 1979, the film entered the public domain in the United States because MGM neglected to renew the film's copyright registration in the 28th year after publication.

Plot

In Italy in 1939, Mr. Imperium uses a ruse to meet attractive lady American Frederica Brown. He is revealed to be Prince Alexis, an heir to the throne and a widower with a five-year-old son. Mr. Imperium nicknames her Fredda and she calls him Al.

When his father becomes gravely ill, Mr. Imperium must rush to be with him but asks prime minister Bernand to deliver a note of explanation to Fredda. Bernand instead informs her that the prince has left permanently as he would often do after seducing women.

Twelve years later, Fredda is now a film star known as Fredda Barlo. Mr. Imperium travels to California, where film producer Paul Hunter is in love with Fredda and proposing marriage. Fredda drives to Palm Springs to consider the proposal and decide which actor should costar in her next film, which will tell the story about a girl who falls in love with a king. Mr. Imperium takes a room next to hers, and soon they meet and embrace. He explains the crisis that took place at home during the war and that had prevented him from finding her. Now he wants a new life and Fredda believes that he could portray the king in her film.

Bernand appears, saying that his son is preparing to ascend to the throne. Mr. Imperium realizes that he is needed there, so he must say goodbye to Fredda once more.

Cast
 Lana Turner as Fredda Barlo
 Ezio Pinza as Mr. Imperium
 Marjorie Main as Mrs. Cabot
 Barry Sullivan as Paul Hunter
 Cedric Hardwicke as Bernand
 Debbie Reynolds as Gwen
 Ann Codee as Anna Pelan
 The Guadalajara Trio as themselves

Soundtrack
 "Andiamo", lyric by Dorothy Fields, music by Harold Arlen

Reception
According to MGM, the film earned $460,000 in the U.S. and Canada and $295,000 elsewhere, resulting in a loss of $1,399,000.

Mr. Imperium was the first of two musicals that MGM attempted with South Pacific stage star and former Metropolitan Opera singer Ezio Pinza. When previews with test audiences proved disastrous, the second film, Strictly Dishonorable, was released first, but with the same unfavorable results.

The film was exhibited mostly as a second feature despite its lavish MGM production in Technicolor and with Lana Turner in a starring role. MGM canceled Pinza's contract after the film's box-office failure.

References

External links

 
 
 
 
 
 
 Mr. Imperium complete film on YouTube

1951 films
1951 romantic drama films

American films based on plays
Films set in California
Metro-Goldwyn-Mayer films
American romantic drama films
Films directed by Don Hartman
Films scored by Bronisław Kaper
1950s English-language films
1950s American films